Muchilot Bhagavathi is the tutelary deity of the Vaniyas of North Malabar. Muchilot Bhagavathi is also worshipped as Eezhala Bhagavati and Maññaḷamma

Legends
The various legends on the origin of Muchilot Bhagavati seem to begin from the point that she was a Brahmin woman born in the mana called Maniyottu in the village of Peringellur, near Taliparamba. They subsequently diverge.

The dominant story goes that following the end of her studies and before her betrothal, the "Peringellur Mootha Gurukkal" (a Brahmin, 'the Elder Teacher of Peringellur') and his disciples challenged the authority of the girl on Vedic matters. Rendered jealous by her wisdom, they asked the girl what the greatest pain and greatest pleasure were, she replied that they were, respectively, giving birth and love-making. The Gurukkal argued that one who had never indulged in love-making or given birth could not know so and thus challenged her virginity. After being expelled from her house, she took refuge in Shiva at the temple in Karivellur and promptly resolved to meet him through suicide. Standing on a bed of burning coal, she asked a vāṇiya to pour coconut oil over her. She then returned to the world as a goddess by the blessing of lord shiva. While travelling in the earth she rested at the home of Muchilot padanair, who was a vāṇiya belonging to Muchilot clan and a soldier of kolathiri king.

Wife of muchilot padanair had an apparition of Sree Muchilot Bhagavathi as she was drawing water from the well. Afterwards, the pot that held the oil that burned the girl began to levitate.Next day the Muchilot padanayar saw the palm tree infront of his house dried. It is believed that the Devi made her presence visible to the Muchilodan Padanayar when he decided to cut the tree. The Karanavar then also had a vision that the soul of the virgin had been sent back by Lord Shiva to abide in him. They placed the goddess in a silver chest in the western chamber of the house.This is how the Muchilottu Bhaghavathy associated with the vāṇiya community. Muchilottu Vaniyan and others in his community started worshipping the goddess as their family deity. Thus the goddess came to be known as ‘Muchilottu Bhagavathi’.

References

External links

 , Official Website
 , the Land of Theyyam.
 : Theyyam Images, History, Kaav.
 , including images.

Theyyam
Arts of Kerala
Hindu goddesses